Princetown is a town in Schenectady County, New York, United States. The population was 2,115 at the 2010 census. It is in the central part of the county, west of the town of Rotterdam.

History 
The current Town of Princetown was established in 1798 by the New York State Legislature combining lands formerly known as Corry's Bush and land belonging to the Dutch Reformed Church in Schenectady. It was named for John Prince, a New York State assemblyman from Albany County who lived in Schenectady proper at the time. Many of the early settlers of the town were from Scotland, and for almost all of its history, the town has been rural with an economy based in agriculture. Today the town is mostly a mix of farming and exurban development with a little light industry.

In the past, the town had seven one-room schools. It was also home to the Princetown Academy and Female Seminary which opened in 1853 but operated for only three years before succumbing to financial mismanagement. The Academy was sponsored by the local Presbyterian church. In 1854, it had more than 400 students mostly from the local region but also included students from as far away as Cuba, Germany and Scotland. The Academy was located in the former hamlet of Princetown (Center).

In the south end of the town was Cheeseman's Tavern (c. 1784) located in the hamlet of Gifford's (Corners). Its owner, Joshua Cheeseman, was for a few years, a regionally well-known shinplaster banker, producing a number of paper notes used across the region.

In the north end of the town, on the border with Duanesburg, was the location of the estate of George William Featherstonaugh, which was the subject of several Thomas Cole paintings.  Featherstonaugh was an English-American geographer and geologist also especially interested in the use of rail transportation to modernize farming.

Geography
The north town line is the border of Montgomery County, and the south town line is the border of Albany County. The town of Rotterdam is to the east, and the town of Duanesburg is to the west.

Demographics

In the 2000 census, there were 2,132 people, 797 households, and 611 families residing in the town. The population density was 88.7 people per square mile (34.2/km2). There were 835 housing units at an average density of 34.7 per square mile (13.4/km2). The racial makeup of the town was 98.69% White, 0.19% African American, 0.19% Native American, 0.19% Asian, 0.09% Pacific Islander, 0.19% from other races, and 0.47% from two or more races. Hispanic or Latino of any race were 0.66% of the population.

There were 797 households, out of which 33.6% had children under the age of 18 living with them, 65.9% were married couples living together, 7.3% had a female householder with no husband present, and 23.3% were non-families. 17.7% of all households were made up of individuals, and 5.5% had someone living alone who was 65 years of age or older. The average household size was 2.68 and the average family size was 3.05.

In the town, the population was spread out, with 25.1% under the age of 18, 5.8% from 18 to 24, 28.5% from 25 to 44, 28.8% from 45 to 64, and 11.8% who were 65 years of age or older. The median age was 41 years. For every 100 females, there were 105.8 males. For every 100 females age 18 and over, there were 102.2 males.

The median income for a household in the town was $57,250, and the median income for a family was $63,077. Males had a median income of $45,750 versus $28,362 for females. The per capita income for the town was $24,292. About 1.6% of families and 3.3% of the population were below the poverty line, including 5.3% of those under age 18 and 3.6% of those age 65 or over.

Communities and locations in Princetown 
Bradshaw's Corners - an area where North Kelly and Weast Roads meet at Mariaville Road (NY 159).
Gifford's (Corners) - a small hamlet in the south part of the town located at the intersection of New York State route 406 and U.S. Route 20. It was once home to Cheeseman's Tavern, the owner of which was known as a "shinplaster" banker.
Kelly's Station - A small hamlet in the southeast part of the town; it was home to a train station for the Schenectady and Duanesburg Railroad, (a line now operated by the Delaware and Hudson Railway) a store and post office. It is also known for a set of double culverts that were built to carry the railroad over Kelly Station Road and the Bonny Kill or Bonny Brook.
Mariaville (Lake) - A hamlet and CDP on the border between the town and the town of Duanesburg toward the northern end of the town.
Pattersonville – A hamlet and part of a CDP (Census Designated Place) partly in the northern part of the town.
Princetown (Center) – A hamlet often mistakenly considered to be in the southern part of the town, this area was actually known as Princetown P.O. until the arrival of the Schenectady and Duanesburg Railroad (owned by the Delaware and Hudson Railroad) in 1873. After that time it was known as Kelly's Station. There was, however, a hamlet located in the center of the town known as Princetown, or Princetown Center which developed around the second Presbyterian Church in the town at corner of present-day Currybush and North Kelly roads. This hamlet was also home to the Princetown Academy and Female Seminary from 1853 to 1856.
Rynex Corners - A hamlet in the northern part of the town on the border between Princetown and the town of Rotterdam. It once contained a hotel and cheese factory.
Willow Run - a modern subdivision in the middle of the town north of the D&H railway line.

Notable people
George William Featherstonaugh, an English-American geologist and geographer who once owned a large estate on the border between Duanesburg and Princetown. The estate was the subject of several Thomas Cole paintings.
Nelson Fryer, Wisconsin State Assembly member and farmer, was born in Princetown.

References

External links 
 Map of historical locations in Princetown
 

Towns in Schenectady County, New York